Panopoulos is a Greek surname. Notable people include:

Christos Panopoulos, Greek businessman
Mike Panopoulos (born 1976), Greek-born Australian-Greek footballer
Sam Panopoulos (1934–2017), Greek-born Canadian businessman, inventor of Hawaiian pizza

Surnames of Greek origin